Renewable energy in Brunei includes the photovoltaic power generation in Brunei.

Photovoltaic power
Brunei opened its first solar power plant, the 1.2 MW Tenaga Suria Brunei photovoltaic power plant, on 26 May 2011 by Sultan Hassanal Bolkiah. The plant powers up around 200 houses in the nation.

See also

 Energy in Brunei

References

Energy in Brunei